Palwankar Ganpat was an Indian first-class cricketer. He was the brother of the notable cricketers Palwankar Baloo, Palwankar Shivram and Palwankar Vithal. Like his  brothers, Ganpat played for several clubs including the Hindus team in the Bombay Quadrangular competition.

References

Indian cricketers
Hindus cricketers
People from Maharashtra
Marathi people